Peter Harvey (October 17, 1798 – July 12, 1877) was an American merchant and author contemporary of Daniel Webster. He was known as Webster's closest friend and confidant. Harvey is known for the book that he authored about the life of Webster.

Published works 
 Harvey, Peter and Towle, George Makepeace. Reminiscences and anecdotes of Daniel Webster, Little, Brown, and Company, 1877.

References 

1798 births
1877 deaths
People from Tazewell County, Virginia
American merchants
19th-century American businesspeople